Margrit Rainer born as Margrit Rosa Sandmeier (9 February 1914 – 10 February 1982) was a Swiss comedian, radio personality, and stage and film actress starring usually in Swiss German language cinema and television and stage productions.

Early life and education 
Born and raised in Zürich-Oerlikon, Canton of Zürich in Switzerland, to Elise née Boller and Johannes Rudolf, Margrit Rosa Sandmeier dreamed of a circus career. Her parents forced her to make an apprenticeship as a photo lab assistant, but she secretly took acting classes and singing lessons. At the age of 18, she married Fritz Pfister, a Swiss actor, and they emigrated to Ibiza, where they operated a chicken farm. But the marriage broke up and she returned to Switzerland. Rainer worked as a cashier at the Zürich hotel Hirschen in 1934, the venue of the Cabaret Cornichon.

Theater, film and television and children's voice actress 
After first appearances at the Schweizerisches Volkstheater in 1938, Rainer debuted as chinesische Mutter ("Chinese mother") at the Cabaret Cornichon. Engagements at the Corso Theater Zürich and on occasion of the Swiss National Exhibition Landi'39 at Zürichhorn as Mäiti in the Swiss-German play "Steibruch", brought her artistic breakthrough. In the meanwhile, she also staged on the cabarets Resslirytti in Basel and Nebelhorn in Zürich, but from 1938 to 1950 she was a member of the Cornichon ensemble in Zürich where she met Ruedi Walter. She also played in various radio plays, among others in Regenpfeifer by Jürg Amstein and Artur Beul in 1948.

After participation in the musical "Eusi chliini Stadt" at the opening of the Theater am Hechtplatz in Zürich in 1959, Rainer staged there in the 1960s on a regular basis, so in several musicals such as "Bibi Balù" and "Golden Girl". In 1969 Rainer played at the Basler Theater the role of mother in the dialect version of Edward Bond's "Saved".

Margrit Rainer's premiered in the 1951 Swiss film Wahrheit oder Schwindel; her most popular films include Peter's mother in Heidi in 1951 and in 1955 in the sequel, Polizischt Wäckerli in 1956, Die Käserei in der Vehfreude two years later, An heiligen Wassern (Sacred Waters) in 1960 and Demokrat Läppli starring Alfred Rasser in 1961, in 1971 Der Kapitän (The Captain) and ten years later Der Erfinder (The Inventor). In the Swiss television she appeared in 25 episodes of Ein Fall für Mändli alongside Ruedi Walter and Inigo Gallo between 1973 and 1975.

Beside the stage and television and film, from 1970 to 1982 she participated in a number of children's fairy tales and musicals directed by Jörg Schneider.

Margrit Rainer, Ruedi Walter and Inigo Gallo 

Margrit Rainer first appeared with Ruedi Walter as cabaret duo in 1951, first among others in a dialect version of Jan de Hartog's "Das Himmelbett", then in numerous popular dialect farces. As "Ehepaar Ehrsam" (Ehrsam couple) in the popular satirical radio program "Spalebärg 77a" from 1955 to 1965 the duo Rainer-Walter became very popular; Spalbärg 77a was filmed in 1957, and in 1962 produced as a musical. Rainer and Walter played in numerous popular dialect plays and farces, and were during thirty years probably the most popular entertainment duo in Switzerland. At the Schauspielhaus Zürich, they had great success in "Die Kleine Niederdorf-Oper" (1951 and 1959) and in 1954 in "Der schwarze Hecht". Great touring successes were among others the dialect adaption of Arthur Lovegrove's "Goodnight, Mrs. Puffin!" in 1969, in 1977 "D'Mueter wott nur  s'Bescht", and in 1980 "Potz Millione", both directed by Rainer's spouse Inigo Gallo. Rainer, Gallo and Walter worked in a variety of dialect plays and musicals. Gallo directed, among other things his own Swiss German versions of farces like "Hurra, en Bueb!" "D'Mutter wott nur s'Bescht" and "Potz Millione", that became in 1980 a great success, touring with Rainer, Walter, Gallo and Ines Torelli.

Personal life 
Born in Zürich, Margrit Rainer was citizen of Seengen, by first marriage of Richterswil, and since 1975 also citizen of Zürich.

Margrit Rainer and Ruedi Walter often was rumored to be a couple; indeed in the early days of their joint cooperation, but in 1959 the private paths of the film and stage partner separated. Margrit Rainer found in Inigo Gallo a new partner who also frequently appeared on the side of Margrit Rainer and Ruedi Walter in films and the theater.

Margrit Rainer died after a routine intervention: a cyst was removed in her abdomen, but she died a short time later from internal bleeding on 10 February 1982. She was buried at Enzenbühl cemetery in Zürich-Weinegg alongside Inigo Gallo and his wife from first marriage.

Aftermath 
Margrit Rainer became very popular as she often played the role of the petty-bourgeois housewife and wife, and was to the early 1980s the most popular Swiss folk actress, the "Mother of the Nation"; radiant and warm...but also complex, dark and broken. Only with this double meaning you will do her justice.

Adjacent to the Ruedi-Walter-Strasse in Zürich-Oerlikon where she was born, the Margrit-Rainer-Strasse was named after the popular actress. At the Theater Rigiblick, on occasion of the artist's 100th birthday, in September 2014 premiered Euse Rainer chönnt das au!, a play respectively musical dedicated to Margrit Rainer, who's still popular although she died 32 years ago.

Filmography (selected works) 

 1981: Potz Millione (broadcast of the theater play) 
 1981: Der Erfinder  (The Inventor)
 1973–1975: Ein Fall für Männdli (Television series, 25 episodes) 
 1972: Nid jetz, Schatz! (Television film)
 1972: Gute Abig, Signor Steiger (Television film)
 1971: Der Kapitän (The Captain) 
 1969: Pfarrer Iseli 
 1968: Sommersprossen (aka Beyond Control, Sex and Violence Beyond Control, aka What a Way to Die) 
 1968: Die sechs Kummerbuben 
 1967: Polizist Wäckerli in Gefahr (Policeman Waeckerli in Danger) 
 1966: Geld und Geist (Money and Spirit) 
 1962: Der 42. Himmel (The 42nd Heaven) 
 1962: Jakobli and Meyeli 
 1962: Anne Bäbi Jowäger - II. Teil: Jakobli und Meyeli
 1961: Demokrat Läppli 
 1960: An heiligen Wassern (Sacred Waters) 
 1960: Anne Bäbi Jowäger - I. Teil: Wie Jakobli zu einer Frau kommt 
 1959: Hinter den sieben Gleisen 
 1958: Die Käserei in der Vehfreude (aka The Fear of Power) 
 1958: Zum goldenen Ochsen (Golden Ox Inn) 
 1958: Der 10. Mai (The Tenth of May) 
 1956: Oberstadtgass 
 1956: Polizischt Wäckerli 
 1955: Heidi und Peter (Heidi and Peter) 
 1952: Heidi 
 1952: Palace Hotel 
 1951: Wahrheit oder Schwindel

Awards 
 1978: Prix Walo
 1958: Movie award of the city of Zürich (Filmpreis der Stadt Zürich)

Literature 
 Ernst Reinhardt: Ruedi Walter. Spuren eines Schauspielerlebens. Friedrich Reinhardt Verlag, Basel 1984, .

References

External links 

 
 
 Margrit Rainer on the website of the Swiss national television SRF 

1914 births
1982 deaths
Swiss stage actresses
Swiss film actresses
20th-century Swiss actresses
Actors from Zürich
Kabarettists
Swiss radio actresses
Swiss women comedians
Swiss musical theatre actresses
Swiss television actresses
Swiss voice actresses
20th-century Swiss women singers
People from Lenzburg District
People from Richterswil
20th-century comedians